SOF may refer to:

Science Olympiad Foundation, based in New Delhi, India 
Sea of Faith, a Christian liberal philosophical movement
Sea of Faith (TV series), by the BBC
Sofia Airport, Bulgaria (IATA airport code)
Soldier of Fortune (disambiguation)
Sound-on-film, technology that stores a movie's soundtrack on the film
Special operations forces, military and police units
Start of frame delimiter, in computer networks data transmission
Statement of Facts, a report of a ship's stay in port
Stretton-on-Fosse, a village in Great Britain
Student of Fortune, an online tutoring company
Superior orbital fissure, a foramen in the skull
Special Operations Force (Singapore), Singapore Police